The giant cowbird (Molothrus oryzivorus) is a large passerine bird in the New World family Icteridae. It breeds from southern Mexico south to northern Argentina, and on Trinidad and Tobago. It may have relatively recently colonised the latter island.

It is associated with open woodland and cultivation with large trees, but is also the only cowbird that is found in deep forest.  It is a quiet bird, particularly for an icterid, but the male has an unpleasant screeched whistle, shweeaa-tpic-tpic. The call is a sharp  chek-chik.  They are also very adept mimics.

Like other cowbirds, it is a brood parasite, laying its eggs in the nests of oropendolas and caciques. The eggs are of two types, either whitish and unspotted, or pale blue or green with dark spots and blotches. The host's eggs and chicks are not destroyed.

Their icterid hosts breed colonially, and defend their nests vigorously, so even a large, bold and aggressive species like the giant cowbird has to cover an extensive territory to find sufficient egg-laying opportunities. Several giant cowbird eggs may be laid in one host nest.

She is less iridescent than the male, and the absence of the neck ruff makes her look less small-headed. Juvenile males are similar to the adult male, but browner, and with a pale, not black, bill.

This gregarious bird feeds mainly on insects, and some seeds, including rice, and forages on the ground or in trees. They also search for fruit, nectar, and arthropods along lakes and rivers, and in banana plantations and corn. It rarely perches on cattle, unlike some of its relatives, but in Brazil it will ride on capybaras as it removes ticks and/or horse flies.

References

Further reading

 New World Blackbirds by Jaramillo and Burke,

External links 
 Giant cowbird videos on the Internet Bird Collection
 Stamps (for Mexico) with range map
 Giant cowbird photo gallery VIREO Photo-High Res
 Photo; Article geometer–"Brazil Birds"

Brood parasites
giant cowbird
Birds of Central America
Birds of the Amazon Basin
Birds of the Guianas
Birds of the Pantanal
Birds of Trinidad and Tobago
Birds of Colombia
Birds of Venezuela
Birds of Ecuador
Birds of Mexico
giant cowbird
giant cowbird
Birds of Brazil